Macrobrochis albifascia is a moth of the family Erebidae. It was described by Cheng-Lai Fang in 1982. It is found in Tibet.

References

Lithosiina
Moths described in 1982